El Mdou is a village in the south of Tunisia located eight kilometers west of Gabès and dependent on the governorate of Gabès. A regional road crosses it and connects it to Gabès and Matmata, in particular through a bus line. One road goes towards El Hamma and another towards Limaya. The village is home to a school, a mosque and an Antenna   to cover the Gabès region.

See also 

 Gabés

References 

Gabès Governorate
Communes of Tunisia